Jason Lester (born in Montreal, Quebec) is a professional poker player who has also lived in New York City and Los Angeles. He currently resides in Miami, FL. He is also an exceptional backgammon player and has won many tournaments in the past, but now he focuses on poker. He finished in 4th place at the 2003 World Series of Poker (WSOP), the year Chris Moneymaker won the event. Lester was also involved in the film Lucky You, starring Robert Duvall, Eric Bana, and Drew Barrymore, in which he played himself, among other poker stars.

Lester picked up his first career WSOP bracelet in the 2006 $5,000 pot limit hold'em event.

As of 2011, his total live tournament winnings exceed $2,099,689. His 21 cashes as the WSOP account for $1,620,443 of those winnings.

References

External links

 PokerListings.com interview
 Hendon Mob tournament results

Canadian poker players
American poker players
World Series of Poker bracelet winners
Canadian backgammon players
American backgammon players
Anglophone Quebec people
Sportspeople from Montreal
Sportspeople from Miami
Sportspeople from New York City
Sportspeople from Los Angeles
Living people
Year of birth missing (living people)